Secret Story - Casa dos Segredos: Luta Pelo Poder is the new all-stars format of the Portuguese version of the reality show Secret Story, which based on the original French version and of Big Brother. It was officially confirmed on 19 February 2015, and the season started on 22 February 2015, lasted 3 weeks, ended on 15 March 2015. The prize is €7,500. Desafio Final 3 housemates won't be able to participate in this season. 

In this format the housemates was divided in two groups, and those groups faced each other on challenges, nominations and evictions.

Portugal was the first country worldwide to have four all-star seasons of the format.

Housemates

Agnes 
Agnes Marques was a housemate in Secret Story 5. She entered the house on Day 1, as the lord of Bruno.
 Results:
 Secret Story 5: She was the 2nd Finalist in the Final of Secret Story 5 with 23% of the votes.
 Secret Story: Luta Pelo Poder: She was the 3rd housemate to be evicted against Bruno, Sandra and Vera with 77% of the votes.

António 
António Queirós was a housemate in Secret Story 1 and guest in Desafio Final 1. He entered the house on Day 1, as the lord of Tatiana.
 Results:
 Secret Story 1: He was the winner of Secret Story 1 with 43% of the votes.
 Secret Story: Luta Pelo Poder:  He was the 5th housemate to be evicted against all the other housemates with 3% of the votes to save.

Bruno 
Bruno Savate️️ was a housemate in Secret Story 5. He entered the house on Day 1, as the servant of Agnes.
 Results:
 Secret Story 5: He was the 3rd Finalist in the Final of Secret Story 5 with 22% of the votes.
 Secret Story: Luta Pelo Poder: He was the winner of Secret Story: Luta Pelo Poder with 42% of the votes to win.

Daniela 
Daniela Pimenta was a housemate in Secret Story 2 and Desafio Final 1. She entered the house on Day 1, as the lord of Miguel.
 Results:
 Secret Story 2: She was the 12th housemate evicted on Secret Story 2 against Daniela S. with 72% of the votes.
 Secret Story: Desafio Final 1: She was the 6th Finalist in the Final of Desafio Final 1 with 2% of the votes.
 Secret Story: Luta Pelo Poder: She was the 1st housemate to be ejected from the house because she was the housemate with the least credits.

Juliana 
Juliana Dias was a housemate in Secret Story 4 and Desafio Final 2. She entered the house on Day 1, as the servant of Sandra.
 Results:
 Secret Story 4: She was the 5th housemate evicted on Secret Story 4 against Érica with 56% of the votes.
 Secret Story: Desafio Final 2: She was the 2nd housemate evicted on Desafio Final 2 alongside Rute against Joana with 42% of the votes.
 Secret Story: Luta Pelo Poder: She was the 3rd Finalist with 8% of the votes to win.

Miguel 
Miguel Caleira was a housemate in Secret Story 2. He entered the house on Day 1, as the servant of Daniela P.
 Results:
 Secret Story 2: He was the 13th housemate evicted on Secret Story 2 against João M. with 52% of the vote.
 Secret Story: Luta Pelo Poder: He was the 2nd housemate to be ejected after the housemates voted his out against Tiago.

Rúben B. 
Rúben Boa-Nova was a housemate in Secret Story 3 and Desafio Final 2. He entered the house on Day 1, as the lord of Vera.
 Results:
 Secret Story 3: He was the winner of Secret Story 3 with 35% of the votes.
 Secret Story: Desafio Final 2: He was the 4th housemate evicted on Desafio Final 2 with Tatiana alongside Joana against Tiago with 54% of the votes.
 Secret Story: Luta Pelo Poder: He was the 4th housemate to be evicted against all the other housemates with 2% of the votes to save.

Rúben N. 
Rúben J. Nave was a housemate in Secret Story 4 and Desafio Final 2. He entered the house on Day 1, as the lord of Tiago.
 Results:
 Secret Story 4: He was the 11th housemate evicted on Secret Story 4 against Diogo with 61% of the vote.
 Secret Story: Desafio Final 2: He was the 1st housemate ejected on Day 10 because he had the least amount of credits.
 Secret Story: Luta Pelo Poder: He was the 1st housemate to be evicted against António, Miguel and Vera with 47% of the votes.

Sandra 
Sandra Costa was a housemate in Secret Story 3 and Desafio Final 1. She entered the house on Day 1, as the lord of Juliana.
 Results:
 Secret Story 3: She was the 8th housemate evicted on Secret Story 3 against Ana and Mara with 56% of the votes.
 Secret Story: Desafio Final 1: She was the 5th housemate evicted on Desafio Final 1 alongside Joana against Ricardo with 61% of the votes.
 Secret Story: Luta Pelo Poder: She was the 5th Finalist with 3% of the votes to win.

Tatiana 
Tatiana Magalhães was a housemate in Secret Story 3 and Desafio Final 2. She entered the house on Day 1, as the servant of António.
 Results:
 Secret Story 3: She was the 15th housemate evicted on Secret Story 3 alongside Alexandra against Jean-Mark and Mara with 41% of the votes.
 Secret Story: Desafio Final 2: She was the 4th housemate evicted on Desafio Final 2 with Rúben B. alongside Joana against Tiago with 54% of the votes.
 Secret Story: Luta Pelo Poder: She was the 2nd housemate to be evicted against Miguel and Rúben B. with 44% of the votes.

Tiago 
Tiago Ginga was a housemate in Secret Story 4 and Desafio Final 2. He entered the house on Day 1, as the servant of Rúben N.
 Results:
 Secret Story 4: He was the 13th housemate evicted on Secret Story 4 alongside Bernardina against Diogo, Érica, and Sofia with 10% of the votes to save.
 Secret Story: Desafio Final 2: He was the 6th housemate evicted on Desafio Final 2 against Fábio with 60% of the votes.
 Secret Story: Luta Pelo Poder: He was the 2nd Finalist with 41% of the votes to win.

Vera 
Vera Ferreira was a housemate in Secret Story 1 and guest in Desafio Final 1. She entered the house on Day 1, as the servant of Rúben B.
 Results:
 Secret Story 1: She was the 3rd Finalist in the Final of Secret Story 1 with 17% of the votes.
 Secret Story: Luta Pelo Poder: She was the 4th Finalist with 6% of the votes to win.

Secrets 
In this All-Stars season there was only one secret: the Power secret.

Nominations table

Notes

Nominations total received

Nominations: Results

Twists

Lord and Servant 
On the launch of Luta Pelo Poder, the housemates were divided into two teams, the Lords and the Servants. The servants had to live in a separate room with worst conditions, and had to sever their lords for everything. The roles can change place each day.

Houseguests

Fake nominations 
On Day 5, Teresa did a fake eviction, in which between the nominees of the week Vera was fake evicted, and sent to the Secret Room until the end of the live show. As the housemates thought it was true, housemates fake nominated each other face-to-face. This time no-one was immune. Agnes, Juliana and Rúben N. would be nominated if it was true.

Ratings

Live Shows 

The first live show started 11pm, after the finale of Desafio Final 3. And the final live show started 11pm, after the premiere of "A Única Mulher".

References

External links 
 Official Website 
 Fan Website 

Luta Pelo Poder
2015 Portuguese television seasons